Agenor (Ancient Greek: Ἀγήνωρ or Αγήνορας Agēnor; English translation: "heroic, manly") was in Greek mythology and history a Phoenician king of Tyre or Sidon. The Greek historian Herodotus (c. 484–425 BC), born in the city of Halicarnassus under the Achaemenid Empire, estimated that Agenor lived either 1000 or 1600 years prior to his visit to Tyre in 450 BC at the end of the Greco-Persian Wars (499–449 BC). He was said to have reigned in that city for 63 years.

Family
Agenor was born in Memphis of Egypt to Poseidon and Libya and he had a twin brother named Belus. The latter remained in Egypt and reigned over there while Agenor departed to Phoenicia and reigned there. In a rare version of the myth, Agenor and Belus had another brother named Enyalios. According to other sources, he was the son of Belus and brother of Phineus, Phoenix, Aegyptus and Danaus. This tradition was followed by Tzetzes but he added Ninus as one of the six brothers. The same author claimed that there were two Agenors, the first one being the brother of Belus while the second was the son of the latter, thus uncle of the first Agenor. 

Sources differed also as to Agenor's children; he was said to have been the father of Europa, Cadmus, Cilix, Phoenix, Phineus, Thasus and sometimes, Syros and Cepheus. Agenor's wife was variously given as Telephassa, Argiope, Antiope, and Tyro, with the latter giving her name to the city of Tyre. According to Pherecydes of Athens, his first wife was Damno, daughter of Belus, who bore him Phoenix and two daughters, Isaia and Melia, who married Aegyptus and Danaus, respectively; Agenor then fathered Cadmus with Argiope, daughter of the river-god Neilus.

In the Iliad, however, Europa was clearly a daughter of Phoenix. Either Cadmus or Europa were confirmed as children of Phoenix by the Ehoeae attributed to Hesiod, Bacchylides, Moschus and various scholia. Cilix and Phineus were also sons of Phoenix according to Pherecydes, who also added an otherwise unknown son named Doryclus.

Most later sources listed Cadmus and Cilix as sons of Agenor directly without mentioning Phoenix. On the rare occasions when he was mentioned, Phoenix was listed as the brother of Cadmus and Cilix. Whether he was included as a brother of Agenor or as a son, his role in mythology was limited to inheriting his father's kingdom and to becoming the eponym of the Phoenicians. All accounts agreed on a Phoenician king who has several children, including the two sons named Cadmus and Cilix and a daughter named Europa.

A certain Eidothea, wife of Phineus, was called the sister of Cadmus and thus maybe the daughter of Agenor. Taygete, usually one of the Pleiades and mother of Lacedemon by Zeus was also said to be the daughter of Agenor.

Mythology

Zeus saw Agenor's daughter Europa gathering flowers and immediately fell in love with her. Zeus transformed himself into a white bull and carried Europa away to the island of Crete. He then revealed his true identity and Europa became the first queen of Crete. Agenor, meanwhile, sent Europa's brothers, Cadmus and Cilix in search of her, telling them not to return without her. In some versions of the tale, Agenor sends her other brothers as well: Phineus or Thasus (and of course Phoenix in the versions in which Cadmus's father is Agenor).

As Europa could not be found, none of the brothers returned. Cadmus consulted the oracle of Delphi and was advised to travel until encountering a cow. He was to follow this cow and to found a city where the cow would lie down; this city became Thebes. Cilix searched for her and settled down in Asia Minor.  The land was called Cilicia after him.

According to the chronicler Malalas, when Agenor was about to die, he order that all the land he had conquered be divided among his three sons. Phoenix took Tyre and its hinterland, and called the country Phoenicia after himself. Similarly, Syros call the country allotted to him Syria. Likewise, Cilix called the latitudes allotted to him Cilicia.

Identity and deeds
Virgil called Carthage the city of Agenor, by which he alluded to the descent of Dido from Agenor. German philologist Philipp Karl Buttmann pointed out that the genuine Phoenician name of Agenor was Chnas or Khna, which was the same as Canaan, and upon these facts he built the hypothesis that Agenor or Chnas was the same as the Canaan in the books of Moses. Quintus Curtius Rufus considered Agenor to have been the founder of Sidon, and he was also popularly supposed to have introduced the Phoenician alphabet, which was later taught by Cadmus to the Greeks and became the foundation of their own writing system.

Argive family tree

Notes

References 

 Aeschylus, translated in two volumes. 2. Suppliant Women by Herbert Weir Smyth, Ph. D. Cambridge, MA. Harvard University Press. 1926. Online version at the Perseus Digital Library. Greek text available from the same website.
 Antoninus Liberalis, The Metamorphoses of Antoninus Liberalis translated by Francis Celoria (Routledge 1992). Online version at the Topos Text Project.
 Apollodorus, The Library with an English Translation by Sir James George Frazer, F.B.A., F.R.S. in 2 Volumes, Cambridge, MA, Harvard University Press; London, William Heinemann Ltd. 1921. ISBN 0-674-99135-4. Online version at the Perseus Digital Library. Greek text available from the same website.
 Apollonius Rhodius, Argonautica translated by Robert Cooper Seaton (1853-1915), R. C. Loeb Classical Library Volume 001. London, William Heinemann Ltd, 1912. Online version at the Topos Text Project.
 Apollonius Rhodius, Argonautica. George W. Mooney. London. Longmans, Green. 1912. Greek text available at the Perseus Digital Library.
 Bacchylides, Odes translated by Diane Arnson Svarlien. 1991. Online version at the Perseus Digital Library.
 Bacchylides, The Poems and Fragments. Cambridge University Press. 1905. Greek text available at the Perseus Digital Library.
 Dictys Cretensis, from The Trojan War. The Chronicles of Dictys of Crete and Dares the Phrygian translated by Richard McIlwaine Frazer, Jr. (1931-). Indiana University Press. 1966. Online version at the Topos Text Project.
 Diodorus Siculus, The Library of History translated by Charles Henry Oldfather. Twelve volumes. Loeb Classical Library. Cambridge, Massachusetts: Harvard University Press; London: William Heinemann, Ltd. 1989. Vol. 3. Books 4.59–8. Online version at Bill Thayer's Web Site
 Diodorus Siculus, Bibliotheca Historica. Vol 1-2. Immanel Bekker. Ludwig Dindorf. Friedrich Vogel. in aedibus B. G. Teubneri. Leipzig. 1888-1890. Greek text available at the Perseus Digital Library.
 Euripides, The Tragedies of Euripides translated by T. A. Buckley. Bacchae. London. Henry G. Bohn. 1850. Online version at the Perseus Digital Library.
 Euripides, Euripidis Fabulae. vol. 3. Gilbert Murray. Oxford. Clarendon Press, Oxford. 1913. Greek text available at the Perseus Digital Library.
 Fowler, R. L. (2000), Early Greek Mythography: Volume 1: Text and Introduction, Oxford University Press, 2000. .
 Gaius Julius Hyginus, Fabulae from The Myths of Hyginus translated and edited by Mary Grant. University of Kansas Publications in Humanistic Studies. Online version at the Topos Text Project.
 Gaius Valerius Flaccus, Argonautica translated by Mozley, J H. Loeb Classical Library Volume 286. Cambridge, MA, Harvard University Press; London, William Heinemann Ltd. 1928. Online version at theio.com.
 Gaius Valerius Flaccus, Argonauticon. Otto Kramer. Leipzig. Teubner. 1913. Latin text available at the Perseus Digital Library.
 Gantz, Timothy, Early Greek Myth: A Guide to Literary and Artistic Sources, Johns Hopkins University Press, 1996, Two volumes:  (Vol. 1),  (Vol. 2).
 Herodotus, The Histories with an English translation by A. D. Godley. Cambridge. Harvard University Press. 1920. Online version at the Topos Text Project. Greek text available at Perseus Digital Library.
 Hesiod, Catalogue of Women from Homeric Hymns, Epic Cycle, Homerica translated by Evelyn-White, H G. Loeb Classical Library Volume 57. London: William Heinemann, 1914. Online version at theio.com
 Homer, The Iliad with an English Translation by A.T. Murray, Ph.D. in two volumes. Cambridge, MA., Harvard University Press; London, William Heinemann, Ltd. 1924. Online version at the Perseus Digital Library.
 Homer, Homeri Opera in five volumes. Oxford, Oxford University Press. 1920. Greek text available at the Perseus Digital Library.
 Lucian of Samosata, Dialogues of the Sea Gods translated by Fowler, H W and F G. Oxford: The Clarendon Press. 1905. Online version at theoi.com
 Luciani Samosatensis, Opera. Vol I. Karl Jacobitz. in aedibus B. G. Teubneri. Leipzig. 1896. Greek text available at the Perseus Digital Library.
 Maurus Servius Honoratus, In Vergilii carmina comentarii. Servii Grammatici qui feruntur in Vergilii carmina commentarii; recensuerunt Georgius Thilo et Hermannus Hagen. Georgius Thilo. Leipzig. B. G. Teubner. 1881. Online version at the Perseus Digital Library.
 Moschus, Europa from The Greek Bucolic Poets edited by J. M. (John Maxwell) Edmonds. William Heinemann; G. P. Putnam's Sons. London; New York. 1919. Greek text available at the Perseus Digital Library.
 Nonnus of Panopolis, Dionysiaca translated by William Henry Denham Rouse (1863-1950), from the Loeb Classical Library, Cambridge, MA, Harvard University Press, 1940.  Online version at the Topos Text Project.
 Nonnus of Panopolis, Dionysiaca. 3 Vols. W.H.D. Rouse. Cambridge, MA., Harvard University Press; London, William Heinemann, Ltd. 1940-1942. Greek text available at the Perseus Digital Library.
 The Orphic Argonautica, translated by Jason Colavito.  Copyright 2011. Online version at the Topos Text Project.
 Pausanias, Description of Greece with an English Translation by W.H.S. Jones, Litt.D., and H.A. Ormerod, M.A., in 4 Volumes. Cambridge, MA, Harvard University Press; London, William Heinemann Ltd. 1918. Online version at the Perseus Digital Library
 Pausanias, Graeciae Descriptio. 3 vols. Leipzig, Teubner. 1903.  Greek text available at the Perseus Digital Library.
 Publius Ovidius Naso, Letters From Pontus translated by A. S. Kline,  Copyright 2003. Online version at the Topos Text Project.
 Publius Ovidius Naso, Ex Ponto. Arthur Leslie Wheeler. Cambridge, MA. Harvard University Press. 1939. Latin text available at the Perseus Digital Library.
 Publius Ovidius Naso, Metamorphoses translated by Brookes More (1859-1942). Boston, Cornhill Publishing Co. 1922. Online version at the Perseus Digital Library.
 Publius Ovidius Naso, Metamorphoses. Hugo Magnus. Gotha (Germany). Friedr. Andr. Perthes. 1892. Latin text available at the Perseus Digital Library.
 Publius Papinius Statius, The Achilleid translated by Mozley, J H. Loeb Classical Library Volumes. Cambridge, MA, Harvard University Press; London, William Heinemann Ltd. 1928. Online version at the Topos Text Project.
 Publius Papinius Statius, The Achilleid. Vol. II. John Henry Mozley. London: William Heinemann; New York: G.P. Putnam's Sons. 1928. Latin text available at the Perseus Digital Library.
 Publius Vergilius Maro, Aeneid. Theodore C. Williams. trans. Boston. Houghton Mifflin Co. 1910. Online version at the Perseus Digital Library.
 Publius Vergilius Maro, Bucolics, Aeneid, and Georgics. J. B. Greenough. Boston. Ginn & Co. 1900. Latin text available at the Perseus Digital Library.

Sophocles, The Oedipus Tyrannus of Sophocles edited with introduction and notes by Sir Richard Jebb. Cambridge. Cambridge University Press. 1893. Online version at the Perseus Digital Library.
Sophocles, Sophocles. Vol 1: Oedipus the king. Oedipus at Colonus. Antigone. With an English translation by F. Storr. The Loeb classical library, 20. Francis Storr. London; New York. William Heinemann Ltd.; The Macmillan Company. 1912. Greek text available at the Perseus Digital Library.
Suida, Suda Encyclopedia translated by Ross Scaife, David Whitehead, William Hutton, Catharine Roth, Jennifer Benedict, Gregory Hays, Malcolm Heath Sean M. Redmond, Nicholas Fincher, Patrick Rourke, Elizabeth Vandiver, Raphael Finkel, Frederick Williams, Carl Widstrand, Robert Dyer, Joseph L. Rife, Oliver Phillips and many others. Online version at the Topos Text Project.
Tzetzes, John, Book of Histories, Book VII-VIII translated by Vasiliki Dogani from the original Greek of T. Kiessling's edition of 1826. Online version at theio.com
Kings of Tyre
Kings in Greek mythology
Children of Poseidon
Agenorides
Phoenician characters in Greek mythology
Phoenician mythology